Gerald R. Ash (born August 1, 1942) is an American retired electrical engineer who worked at Bell Labs. His research has focused on routing problems; he is known for the development of Dynamic Non-Hierarchical Routing (DNHR).

Biography
Ash received his B.S. in electrical engineering in 1964 from Rutgers University. He attended graduate school at the California Institute of Technology, where he earned his M.S. in 1965 and Ph.D. in 1969, both in electrical engineering. He joined Bell Labs in 1972.

In 1989 Ash was awarded the IEEE Alexander Graham Bell Medal, together with Billy B. Oliver, for their work on DNHR.

In 2001 Ash was inducted into the New Jersey Inventors Hall of Fame for his unique contributions to the telecommunications industry by inventing three dynamic routing schemes, which were patented from 1982 to 1995.

Ash is the author of three books,
"Dynamic Routing in Telecommunications Networks" (1997)
"Traffic Engineering and QoS Optimization of Integrated Voice & Data Networks (Morgan Kaufmann Series in Networking)" (2006)
"Katy's Astonishing Adventures With Tortulus T.Turtle" by Gerald Ash and Katy Chew" (2009)

External links

 Ash's bio at IEEE History Center, written in 1989

Living people
1942 births
People from Paterson, New Jersey
American electrical engineers
Rutgers University alumni
California Institute of Technology alumni
Scientists at Bell Labs
Engineers from New Jersey